Rubus plicatifolius is a North American species of dewberry in the rose family. It is found in eastern and central Canada (Québec, Ontario, New Brunswick, Nova Scotia, and Newfoundland) and in the eastern and central United States (from Maine south to Virginia, west as far as Minnesota, Iowa, and Missouri).

Rubus plicatifolius is a prostrate shrub trailing along the surface of the ground, with straight (not curved) prickles. Leaves are compound with 5 egg-shaped leaflets, plaited and yellowish. Flowers are in elongated groups of several flowers. Fruits are cylindrical rather than spherical.

The genetics of Rubus is extremely complex, so that it is difficult to decide on which groups should be recognized as species. There are many rare species with limited ranges such as this. Further study is suggested to clarify the taxonomy.

References

External links
Photo of herbarium specimen at Missouri Botanical Garden, collected in Missouri in 1951

plicatifolius
Plants described in 1931
Flora of Canada
Flora of the United States